Fernand Etter (4 August 1941 – 4 January 1997) was a French racing cyclist. He rode in the 1967 Tour de France.

References

1941 births
1997 deaths
French male cyclists
Place of birth missing